The 7th Annual NFL Honors was an awards presentation by the National Football League that honored its best players from the 2017 NFL season. It was held on February 3, 2018 at 5:00 PM CT and pre-recorded for same-day broadcast on NBC in the United States at 9:00 PM/8:00 PM CT.

List of award winners

In Memoriam
 Terry Glenn
 Quentin Moses
 Bernie Casey
 Don Ohlmeyer
 Lester Williams
 John Reaves
 John Thierry
 Ben Hawkins
 Ara Parseghian
 Chuck Weber
 Tommy Nobis
 Joe Fortunato
 J.C. Caroline
 William Creasy
 Ken Gray
 Pete Brown
 Joan Tisch
 Ray Brown
 Brad Keys
 Vito Parilli
 Dick Enberg
 Keith Jackson
 Cortez Kennedy
 Y.A. Tittle
 Red Miller
 Dan Rooney

References

NFL Honors 007
2017 National Football League season
2018 in American football
2018 in sports in Minnesota
2010s in Minnesota